Martyn Paul Casey (born 10 July 1960) is an English-born Australian rock bass guitarist. He has been a member of the Triffids, Nick Cave and the Bad Seeds and Grinderman. Casey plays either his Fender Precision Bass or Fender Jazz Bass.

Biography
Martyn Paul Casey was born in Chesterfield, Derbyshire, England on 10 July 1960 and has a twin brother Mark. Casey's original band was called The Nobodies which was formed in February 1980, with Matthew Stirling (Matthew de la Hunty, later of Tall Tales and True) on guitar and Steve Eskine on drums (this line-up of the band released a cassette of their recordings). In early 1981 he left The Nobodies and played in a reggae band, A2Z. When not touring he lives in Fremantle with his wife and children where he plays with The Painkillers.

Career

The Triffids

Casey joined The Triffids in September 1982 replacing bassist Byron Sinclair. With the band, he recorded their second EP, Bad Timing and Other Stories in October. It was issued by Mushroom Records in April 1983. Mushroom let the band go shortly after its release. The group then saved money from support slots with the Hoodoo Gurus, The Church and Hunters and Collectors, to record and release their debut 12-inch vinyl album, Treeless Plain, for Hot Records, a newly established Sydney-based independent label.

In late 1984, The Triffids moved to London, and recorded the EP Field of Glass. The band's line-up stabilised with the addition of 'Evil' Graham Lee on pedal steel guitar. In August 1985, they recorded their second album, Born Sandy Devotional, with Gil Norton (Echo & the Bunnymen). The group were hailed by the British media, were featured on the John Peel show and supported Echo & the Bunnymen.

In 1986, with delays in issuing Born Sandy Devotional, the Triffids returned to Western Australia where they built an eight-track machine inside a shearing shed on the McComb family's farming property and recorded their third album In the Pines. Born Sandy Devotional was eventually released in March 1986, it reached #27 on the UK charts and #64 in Australia. On their return to the UK, they signed a three-record deal with Island Records. In 1987, armed with the considerable budget of £125,000, and the production skills of Gil Norton, David McComb and a new recruit, Adam Peters, concocted the lush orchestrations of the poignant "Bury Me Deep in Love" and the melancholic wide-screen atmosphere of the subsequent Calenture album. Despite the release of another two tracks from the album as singles, "Trick of the Light" and "Holy Water", Calenture did not have the commercial impact expected. 

In 1989, the "Goodbye Little Boy" single featured in the Australian TV soap opera Neighbours. 1989 also saw The Triffids record their last studio album, The Black Swan in England, with producer Stephen Street. Despite being well received, the album wasn't an overwhelming success, which disappointed David and the rest of the band to the point where they decided to dissolve the band. To fulfill their contractual obligations with Island Records, a live album recorded in Stockholm, Stockholm, was released in 1990 the year after The Triffids had split up.

Casey, a talented artist, provides a substantial amount of the art work for the 2009 rock biography on The Triffids, Vagabond Holes: David McComb and the Triffids, edited by Australian academics Niall Lucy and Chris Coughran, including the book's cover.

The Blackeyed Susans

In 1989 Casey joined Bottomless Schooners of Old, made up of McComb on guitar, keyboards and vocals, Lee on pedal steel guitar, Robert Snarski (ex-Chad's Tree) on guitar and vocals, and Ashley Davis on drums. The Bottomless Schooners of Old were a precursor to The Blackeyed Susans He replaced Phil Kakulas who left the Blackeyed Susans for Sydney to play with Martha's Vineyard. Casey however did not appear on any of the band's recorded material and departed shortly after to join Nick Cave and the Bad Seeds.

Nick Cave and the Bad Seeds

Casey joined Nick Cave and the Bad Seeds on bass in April 1990 while the band was touring to support their record The Good Son. Guitarist Kid Congo Powers quit the Bad Seeds; Mick Harvey switched from bass to guitar and Casey was hired to fill the bassist's role. The line up of Nick Cave, Harvey, Blixa Bargeld, Conway Savage, Casey and Thomas Wydler then produced the 1992 album Henry's Dream. The next album was Live Seeds, released in September 1993, which reproduced many of the Henry's Dream songs in a more raw setting.

The Bad Seeds' went on to release Let Love In (April 1994) which contained classic tracks such as "Do You Love Me?", "Red Right Hand", and "Loverman".   This was followed by band's biggest commercial success to date, Murder Ballads (February 1996), which was a culmination of Cave's long-time fascination with "the language of violence" and allowed for further bold experimentation in musical style. Collaborations with Kylie Minogue and PJ Harvey on the singles "Where The Wild Roses Grow" and "Henry Lee" respectively led to mainstream chart success and The Bad Seeds widest exposure ever. This album also saw the addition of two new Bad Seeds, Warren Ellis (Dirty Three) on violin, and Jim Sclavunos on percussion.

March 1997 saw the release of The Bad Seeds' tenth studio album, The Boatman's Call, one of the most critically acclaimed releases by the Bad Seeds. The following year saw the release of The Best of Nick Cave and the Bad Seeds, a collection that spanned the group's entire history. Over the next two years Nick Cave spent working on a variety of projects, with the Bad Seeds going into hiatus.

In 2000 the band entered London's Abbey Road Studios, resulting in the April 2001 release of No More Shall We Part. The next album Nocturama was released in February 2003 to moderate critical success. The fourteenth studio album, Abattoir Blues/The Lyre of Orpheus (September 2004) was a double CD. It was the first album by the band in which Blixa Bargeld did not take part (Bargeld leaving the band to devote more time to Einstürzende Neubauten), drumming duties were split for the two albums, having Thomas Wydler and Jim Sclavunos drum on each CD.
 
In March 2008, the band released their 14th studio album, titled Dig, Lazarus, Dig!!!, inspired by the Biblical story of the resurrection of Lazarus of Bethany by Jesus Christ. Casey remained a member of the Bad Seeds for the subsequent albums Push the Sky Away (2013) and Skeleton Tree (2016).

Grinderman

After heavy touring throughout 2005 with The Bad Seeds in support of Abattoir Blues/The Lyre of Orpheus, Nick Cave began writing songs on guitar, an instrument he'd rarely played. His rudimentary playing gave the new material a rawer feel than much of the Bad Seeds' output.

The group entered the Metropolis Studios in London to record the original Grinderman demos and it was this material that would eventually become the basis for the band's debut album Grinderman. The album was recorded with producer Nick Launay in April at the RAK studios, London and mixed in October at the Metropolis Studios.

Grinderman was released in March 2007. The band made their live debut at the All Tomorrow's Parties Festival in Somerset the following month. This was followed by a one-off show at The Forum in London on 20 June.

Grinderman opened for The White Stripes at their Madison Square Garden show on 24 July 2007, followed by several of their own American tour dates. The band then embarked on a theatre tour of Australia, opening for a Nick Cave 'solo' set, which consisted of the same band members.

The band recorded a second album, Grinderman 2, released in September 2010. The band did a European and North American tour to promote the album's release.

Discography

The Triffids (1983–1990)

The Blackeyed Susans 
 no recorded output

Nick Cave and the Bad Seeds (1990–present) 
 Studio albums
Henry's Dream - Mute Records (1992)
Let Love In - Mute Records (1994)
Murder Ballads - Mute Records (1996)
The Boatman's Call - Mute Records / Reprise Records (1997)
No More Shall We Part - Mute Records (2001)
Nocturama - Mute Records (2003)
Abattoir Blues/The Lyre of Orpheus - Mute Records (2CD) (2004)
Dig, Lazarus, Dig!!! - Mute Records (2008)
Push the Sky Away - Bad Seed Ltd (2013)
Skeleton Tree - Bad Seed Ltd (2016)
 Live albums and compilations
Live Seeds - Mute Records (1993)
The Best of Nick Cave and the Bad Seeds - Mute Records (1998)
B-Sides & Rarities - Mute Records (3CD) (2005)
Abattoir Blues Tour - Mute Records (2CD/2DVD)(2007)

Grinderman (2006–present) 
Grinderman - Mute Records (5 March 2007)
Grinderman 2 (2010)

References

External links
 Triffids official site
 Nick Cave official site

1960 births
Living people
Australian bass guitarists
Australian male guitarists
English bass guitarists
English male guitarists
Male bass guitarists
Nick Cave and the Bad Seeds members
People from Chesterfield, Derbyshire
Musicians from Perth, Western Australia